Timothy Lee Barr (born October 3, 1980) is an American politician who served as a member of the Georgia House of Representatives from the 103rd District. He is a member of the Republican party.

Early life
Barr was born and raised in northeastern Georgia. In high school, Barr worked as a staffer for members of the Georgia General Assembly.

Career 
He learned the construction business from his father and grandfather, eventually starting his own company in 2005.

Georgia House of Representatives 
In 2012, Barr declared his candidacy for the 103rd district in the Georgia House of Representatives. He defeated Ken Russell in the primary election and went on to win the seat unopposed in the November general election.

Since the start of the 2019–2020 legislative session, Barr has served as secretary of the House Small Business Development Committee and chair of the House Code Revision Committee.

2022 congressional election 

On May 14, 2021, Barr declared his candidacy for Georgia's 10th congressional district in the 2022 election.

Personal life 
Barr has been outspoken about his Christian faith, saying, "When you get me, you get a man of faith, of deep convictions. For me, it is who I am. I can't split my life. My faith is who I am and it leads my decisions." He and his wife, Melinda, have been involved in Christian missionary work, including the construction of two orphanages in Bolivia. Barr and his wife attend Killian Hill Baptist Church in Lilburn, Georgia.

Electoral history

References

1980 births
21st-century American politicians
Candidates in the 2022 United States House of Representatives elections
Living people
Republican Party members of the Georgia House of Representatives
People from Lawrenceville, Georgia